Finland is set to participate in the Eurovision Song Contest 2023 in Liverpool, United Kingdom, with "Cha Cha Cha" performed by Käärijä. The Finnish broadcaster  (Yle) organised the national final  2023 in order to select the Finnish entry for the 2023 contest.

Background 

Prior to the 2023 contest, Finland has participated in the Eurovision Song Contest fifty-five times since its first entry in 1961.

The Finnish national broadcaster,  (Yle), broadcasts the event within Finland and organises the selection process for the nation's entry. Yle confirmed their intentions to participate at the 2023 Eurovision Song Contest on 23 May 2022. Finland's entries for the Eurovision Song Contest have been selected through national final competitions that have varied in format over the years. Between 1961 and 2011, a selection show that was often titled  highlighted that the purpose of the program was to select a song for Eurovision. However, since 2012, the broadcaster has organised the selection show  (UMK), which focuses on showcasing new music with the winning song being selected as the Finnish Contest entry for that year. Along with their participation confirmation, the broadcaster also announced that the Finnish entry for the 2023 contest would be selected through  2023.

Before Eurovision

Uuden Musiikin Kilpailu 2023 
The competition consisted of a final on 25 February 2023, held at Logomo in Turku and hosted by Samu Haber. The show was broadcast on Yle TV1 with a second audio program providing commentary in Finnish by Mikko Silvennoinen, in Swedish by Eva Frantz and Johan Lindroos, in English by Jani Kareinen, in Russian by Levan Tvaltvadze, in Ukrainian by Galyna Sergeyeva, in Finnish Sign Language by Miguel Peltomaa, in Northern Sami by Linda Tammela and in Inari Sami by Heli Huovinen.

Competing entries 
A submission period was opened by Yle which lasted between 1 September 2022 and 5 September 2022. At least one of the writers and the lead singer(s) had to hold Finnish citizenship or live in Finland permanently in order for the entry to qualify to compete. A panel of nine experts appointed by Yle selected seven entries for the competition from the 363 received submissions. The experts were Tapio Hakanen (Head of Music at YleX), Aija Puurtinen (vocal coach), Amie Borgar (Head of Music at Yle X3M), Anssi Autio (UMK producer), Johan Lindroos (Head of Music at Yle Radio Suomi), Jussi Mäntysaari (Head of Music at Nelonen Media), Juha-Matti Valtonen (television director), Katri Norrlin (music journalist at YleX) and Samuli Väänänen (Senior Editor at Spotify Finland). The competing entries were presented on 11 January 2023, while their lyric videos were released between 12 and 20 January 2023.

Final 
The final took place on 25 February 2023 where seven entries competed. "Cha Cha Cha" performed by Käärijä was selected as the winner by a combination of public votes (75%) and seven international jury groups from Australia, Germany, Poland, Spain, Sweden, Ukraine and the United Kingdom (25%). The viewers had a total of 882 points to award, while the juries had a total of 294 points to award. Each jury group distributed their points as follows: 2, 4, 6, 8, 10 and 12 points. The viewer vote was based on the percentage of votes each song achieved through the following voting methods: telephone, SMS and app voting. For example, if a song gains 10% of the viewer vote, then that entry would be awarded 10% of 882 points rounded to the nearest integer: 88 points. A total of 231,968 votes were cast during the show: 93,324 votes through telephone and SMS and 138,644 votes through the Yle app.

In addition to the performances of the competing entries, the show was opened by  performing "" and "Ram pam pam", while the interval acts featured 2022 Finnish Eurovision entrants The Rasmus performing their song "Live and Never Die" and Samu Haber performing his song "".

At Eurovision 
According to Eurovision rules, all nations with the exceptions of the host country and the "Big Five" (France, Germany, Italy, Spain and the United Kingdom) are required to qualify from one of two semi-finals in order to compete for the final; the top ten countries from each semi-final progress to the final. The European Broadcasting Union (EBU) split up the competing countries into six different pots based on voting patterns from previous contests, with countries with favourable voting histories put into the same pot. On 31 January 2023, an allocation draw was held, which placed each country into one of the two semi-finals, and determined which half of the show they would perform in. Finland has been placed into the first semi-final, to be held on 9 May 2023, and has been scheduled to perform in the second half of the show.

References

External links 

 Official Yle Eurovision site
 Official Uuden Musiikin Kilpailu site

Countries in the Eurovision Song Contest 2023
2023
Eurovision Song Contest
Eurovision Song Contest